The Baptist State Convention of North Carolina (BSCNC) is an autonomous association of Baptist churches in the state of North Carolina. It is one of the state conventions associated with the Southern Baptist Convention. Headquartered in Cary, North Carolina, the convention is made up of 77 Baptist associations and around 4,300 churches .  The convention is led by three officers, elected annually during the annual meeting of the convention.  The three officers elected to serve the convention for 2022 are: President, Dr. Micheal Pardue (First Baptist Church, Icard), and First Vice-president, Rev. Quintell Hill (Multiply Community Church, Monroe) and Rev. Jason Miller (Dutch Cove Baptist, Canton).  The convention is also led by an Executive Director-Treasurer (EDT).  The current EDT is Rev. Todd Unzicker, Georgia Bulldog fan, who was elected by the convention in May 2021.

History

The convention was founded on March 26, 1830, in Greenville. One of its thirteen founders was Thomas Meredith, who also helped to draft its constitution.

In 1832, the convention established its newspaper, originally a monthly paper called the Interpreter edited by Meredith, but which in 1835 changed to a weekly paper entitled the Biblical Recorder.  It was later to be merged with the Southern Watchman, to become the Recorder and Watchman.
Also in 1832, the convention resolved to purchase a farm "for the establishment of a Baptist Literary Institution on the Manual Labor Principle".  A committee, comprising J.G. Hall, W.R. Hinton, J. Purify, A.S. Wynn, and S. J. Jeffreys was formed to raise USD2,000 for its purchase.  This institution was named Wake Forest Institute, which began operation on 1834-02-01, initially serving 25 students.  In 1839, this was renamed to Wake Forest College.

The convention acquired Buies Creek Academy in 1925.  It still owned it when, in 1979 it became Campbell University.

In 1975, after extensive and vigorous discussion, the BSCNC adopted the following resolution, that contributed to it having more women deacons than any other state in the South, apart from Virginia, by 2005:

Today

As of 2000, there were 3,717 Southern Baptist congregations in North Carolina, with 1,512,058 adherents.
Agencies included the North Carolina Baptist Foundation, which manages the funds of individuals and organizations, and the Biblical Recorder newspaper, which it purchased in 1930.
, there were over 4,300 Southern Baptist congregations in North Carolina.

Affiliated Educational Institutions 
In 2007, the executive committee and Board of Directors of the Convention affirmed a proposal to create a new relationship between the convention and the five affiliated schools. Messengers approved the proposal at the 2007 annual meeting and gave final approval in 2008, thus allowing the schools to elect all their trustees annually. Direct financial support from the convention is being phased out incrementally over a four-year period.

Campbell University
Chowan University
Gardner-Webb University
Mars Hill College
Wingate University

The Baptist State Convention also recognizes a historical relationship with the historic educational institutions based on its founding of Wake Forest University, in 1834 and Meredith College in 1898.  These institutions do not receive funding from the convention, nor are their boards and administration members elected by the convention.  They simply acknowledge a historical relationship with their founding body, the Baptist State Convention of North Carolina.

Affiliated Organizations 
Baptist Children's Homes of North Carolina
North Carolina Baptist Foundation
North Carolina Baptist Hospital
Fruitland Baptist Bible College

Affiliated Retreat Centers
Caraway Conference Center and Camp
North Carolina Baptist Assembly at Fort Caswell
Truett Camp

References

Further reading

External links
Baptist State Convention of North Carolina

Baptist Christianity in North Carolina
Conventions associated with the Southern Baptist Convention
Religious organizations established in 1830
Baptist denominations established in the 19th century
1830 establishments in North Carolina